Sam Gardel is an Australian Italian rugby league player who represented Italy in the 2013 World Cup.He now owns his own electrical company in Brisbane Qld and doesn’t dog the boys.

Playing career

References

1988 births
Living people
Australian people of Italian descent
Australian rugby league players
Italy national rugby league team players
Rugby league players from Queensland
Rugby league props
Souths Logan Magpies players